The West Side Lumber Company railway was the last of the  narrow-gauge logging railroads operating in the American west.

History

West Side Flume & Lumber Company 
The West Side Flume & Lumber Company was founded in May 1898 to log  of land outside of the town of Carter (now called Tuolumne).

Hetch Hetchy and Yosemite Valley Railroad 
In 1900, the lumber company incorporated their railroad as a common carrier called the Hetch Hetchy and Yosemite Valley Railroad. Although it never reached either Hetch Hetchy or Yosemite valley, the company hoped to attract tourist traffic.

West Side Lumber Railroad 
In 1925, the Pickering Lumber Company purchased the West Side Lumber Company.

Westside and Cherry Valley Railroad 

In 1968, Frank Cottle leased the lower end of the railroad from Pickering Lumber and opened the Westside and Cherry Valley Railroad as a tourist attraction. He restored locomotives #12 and #15 to run trains on tracks laid on the old mill site. In 1970, the Pickering Lumber company took over the operation from Cottle and extended the line by 8 miles to River Bridge.

In the late 1970s, Glen Bell, the founder of the Taco Bell restaurant chain opened a tourist railroad at Tuolumne. This  gauge railroad used the lower section of the track and several steam locomotives of the West Side Lumber Company railway. The operation also offered boat rides on the old mill pond and RV parking. It closed in the early 1980s after failing to attract enough visitors.

Locomotives

Narrow gauge

Standard gauge 

Various artifacts of the railroad and photographs are preserved at the Tuolumne City Memorial Museum in Tuolumne, CA.  The museum also arranges annual field trips to West Side logging camps in the woods.

References

External links

Abandonedrails.com: The West Side Lumber Company Railroad
2007-02-23 Press release regarding restoration effort
Tuolumne City Memorial Museum website

Narrow gauge railroads in California
Logging railroads in the United States
Industrial railroads in the United States
3 ft gauge railways in the United States
Railway lines opened in 1900
Railway lines closed in 1962
Defunct California railroads
History of Tuolumne County, California
Transportation in Tuolumne County, California
Railways with Zig Zags